Big Swoop is an sculpture located in Garema Place, Civic, Australian Capital Territory. The sculpture was funded by a grant from the City Renewal Authority.  It depicts an Australian magpie pecking at a chip. The sculpture was installed in Garema Place on 16 March 2022. The sculpture weighs half a metric tonne, is 2.4 metres high and 3.5 metres long, and was created Canberra resident and artist Yanni Pounartzis. The sculpture was vandalised shortly after it was installed. The sculpture was sent to Sydney for repairs in April 2022.

References

Public art in the Australian Capital Territory